In mathematics, the syzygetic pencil or Hesse pencil, named for Otto Hesse, is a pencil (one-dimensional family) of cubic plane elliptic curves in the complex projective plane, defined by the equation

Each curve in the family is determined by a pair of parameter values (not both zero) and consists of the points in the plane whose homogeneous coordinates  satisfy the equation for those parameters.

Each curve in the pencil passes through the nine points of the complex projective plane whose homogeneous coordinates are some permutation of 0, –1, and a cube root of unity. There are three roots of unity, and six permutations per root, giving 18 choices for the homogeneous coordinates of each point, but they are equivalent in pairs giving only nine points. The family of cubics through these nine points forms the Hesse pencil. More generally, one can replace the complex numbers by any field containing a cube root of unity and define the Hesse pencil over this field to be the family of cubics through these nine points.

The nine common points of the Hesse pencil are the inflection points of each of the cubics in the pencil. Any line that passes through at least two of these nine points passes through exactly three of them; the nine points and twelve lines through triples of points form the Hesse configuration.

Every elliptic curve is birationally equivalent to a curve of the Hesse pencil; this is the Hessian form of an elliptic curve. However, the parameters of the Hessian form may belong to an extension field of the field of definition of the original curve.

References

Elliptic curves